Green Lady may refer to:
Chinese Girl, a painting by Vladimir Tretchikoff
Lady of the Green Kirtle, the main villain in C.S. Lewis's book The Silver Chair
Elizabeth Eaton Rosenthal, nicknamed the "Green Lady of Brooklyn"

Legends

Green Lady of Fyvie, a ghost that supposedly wanders the corridors of Fyvie Castle in Aberdeenshire, Scotland
Green Lady of Ashintully Castle in the county of Perthshire, Scotland
Green Lady of Ballindalloch Castle in the Moray region of Scotland
Green Lady of the Barony of Ladyland in North Ayrshire, Scotland
Green Lady of Crathes Castle in Aberdeenshire, Scotland
Green Lady of Knock Castle (Isle of Skye)
Green Lady of Longleat in Somerset, South West England
The Green Lady (Hawaii), a female ghost haunting the gulch of Wahiawa, Oahu

See also
Glaistig
Reportedly haunted locations in Scotland